Exit Smiling is a 1926 American silent comedy film directed by Sam Taylor and starring New York and London revues star Beatrice Lillie in her first (and only silent) film role and Jack Pickford, the brother of star Mary Pickford. The film was also the debut of actor Franklin Pangborn. This film is available on DVD from the Warner Archives Collection.

Plot 
Violet (Beatrice Lillie), the travelling theatre troupe's worst actress, dreams of all she could be if she only had the right opportunities. Jimmy (Jack Pickford) is a runaway bank clerk who joins the troupe as a juvenile lead actor.

Cast

References

External links

 (3 minutes)

1926 films
American silent feature films
American black-and-white films
Films about actors
Films directed by Sam Taylor
Metro-Goldwyn-Mayer films
Silent American comedy films
Films with screenplays by Sam Taylor (director)
1926 comedy films
Surviving American silent films
1920s American films